Casearia quinduensis was a species of flowering plant in the family Salicaceae. It was endemic to Colombia.

References

quinduensis
Extinct plants
Taxonomy articles created by Polbot
Taxa named by Edmond Tulasne